Pramod Kumar Yadav  is a Nepalese politician belonging to CPN (Unified Socialist). He is the incumbent minister of Madhesh Province government. He is member of Provincial Assembly of Madhesh Province.

Political career 
Yadav left CPN (UML) to join the CPN (Unified Socialist) led by former Prime Minister Madhav Kumar Nepal.

Yadav helf Lila Nath Shrestha though both Yadav and Shrestha were elected from same constituency (Siraha 3) from CPN (UML) ticket.

Electoral history

See also 

 Ram Chandra Jha
 Lalbabu Raut ministry 
 CPN (Unified Socialist)
 Satrudhan Mahato
 Ram Saroj Yadav

Reference

Communist Party of Nepal (Unified Socialist) politicians
People from Siraha District
Year of birth missing (living people)
Living people
Provincial cabinet ministers of Nepal
Members of the Provincial Assembly of Madhesh Province
Communist Party of Nepal (Unified Marxist–Leninist) politicians